Onida may refer to:

 Onida, South Dakota
 Onida Electronics

See also
Oneida (disambiguation)